The Walking Dead is a 1936 American horror film directed by Michael Curtiz and starring Boris Karloff, who plays a wrongly executed man who is restored to life by a scientist (Edmund Gwenn). The supporting cast features Ricardo Cortez, Marguerite Churchill, and Barton MacLane. The film was distributed by Warner Bros.

Plot
John Ellman (Boris Karloff) has been framed for murder by a gang of racketeers. He is unfairly tried, and despite the fact that his innocence has been proven, he is sent to the electric chair and executed. Dr. Evan Beaumont (Edmund Gwenn) retrieves his dead body and revives it as part of his experiments to reanimate a dead body and discover what happens to the soul after death.

Dr. Beaumont's use of a mechanical heart to revive the patient foreshadows modern medicine's mechanical heart to keep patients alive during surgery. Although John Ellman has no direct knowledge of anyone wishing to frame him for the murder before he is executed, he gains an innate sense of knowing those who are responsible after he is revived. Ellman takes no direct action against his framers; however, he seeks them out, wishing to know why they had him killed. Each dies a horrible death, and in the end it is their own guilt that causes their deaths.

While confronting the last two villains, Ellman is mortally shot. Dr. Beaumont hurries to his death bed, and although pressed to reveal insights about death, Ellman admonishes, "Leave the dead to their maker. The Lord our God is a jealous God" (from Deuteronomy 6:15). As Ellman dies, the two remaining racketeers are killed when their car runs off the road, crashes into an electric pole, and explodes. The film ends with Dr. Beaumont repeating Ellman's warning about a jealous God.

Cast
 Boris Karloff as John Ellman
 Ricardo Cortez as Mr. Nolan
 Edmund Gwenn as Dr. Evan Beaumont 
 Marguerite Churchill as Nancy
 Warren Hull as Jimmy
 Barton MacLane as Loder
 Henry O'Neill as District Attorney Werner
 Joe King as Judge Roger Shaw
 Addison Richards as Prison Warden
 Paul Harvey as Blackstone
 Robert Strange as Merritt
 Joe Sawyer as "Trigger" Smith
 Eddie Acuff as Betcha
 Kenneth Harlan as Stephen Martin
 Miki Morita as Sako, Loder's Butler
 Frank Darien as Cemetery Caretaker (uncredited)

Production
The Walking Dead'''s executive producer Hal Wallis wrote to the production supervisor, Lou Edelman, on August 16, 1935, that he had sent him a six-page outline for a film titled The Walking Dead. The original story for the film was written by Ewart Adamson and Joseph Fields. On November 1, director Michael Curtiz was sent the draft of the film. A few days before shooting was scheduled, actor Boris Karloff voiced problems involving his character John Ellman. These issues included Ellman's lack of speech, which he felt was too close to his role in Frankenstein (1931), and Ellman's Tarzan-like agility, which he felt would induce laughter. Wallis brought in three more writers for the film.

In addition to Karloff's stunted dialogue, this film's resemblance to Universal's Frankenstein is most obvious when Edmund Gwenn's character revives Karloff, including the dramatic change in music, the pulsating lab equipment, off-kilter camera angles, and, finally, Gwenn saying, "He's alive".The Walking Dead was filmed at Griffith Park, California, and Warner Bros. Studios between November 23 and December 1935.

Dialogue director Irving Rapper worked on the film. He called it "a bad story" but enjoyed working with Curtiz.

Release and receptionThe Walking Dead premiered on February 29, 1936. Writing in the March 4, 1936, issue of Variety, the reviewer "Odec" said that the film would provide "limited satisfaction" for film patrons with "a yen for shockers." The reviewer wrote: "The director and the supporting cast try hard to give some semblance of credibility to the trite and pseudo-scientific vaporings of the writers, but the best they can produce is something that moves swiftly enough but contains little of sustained interest."  Further, "Odec" predicted: "Karloff will have to be sold on past performances" as The Walking Dead "lets him down badly."

The film was re-released theatrically in 1942. Two decades later, United Artists Associates syndicated the film to local US television stations as part of its 58-film package "Science Fiction-Horror-Monster Features." The package became available on May 15, 1963.

See also
 Boris Karloff filmography
 The Man They Could Not Hang''

References

Bibliography

External links 

 
 
 
 

1936 horror films
1936 films
1930s English-language films
American black-and-white films
American supernatural horror films
Films about capital punishment
Films about miscarriage of justice
Films about pianos and pianists
Films directed by Michael Curtiz
Warner Bros. films
1930s American films
Films scored by Bernhard Kaun
Resurrection in film